Frederick Burton (born 15 March 1959) is a British former alpine skier who competed in the 1984 Winter Olympics.

References

External links
 

1959 births
Alpine skiers at the 1984 Winter Olympics
British male alpine skiers
Living people
Olympic alpine skiers of Great Britain